Highgate Private Hospital, in View Road, Highgate is run by Aspen Healthcare, a subsidiary of United Surgical Partners International.

History
The hospital was established in 1988. The building was acquired by Health Care REIT, Inc. in 2015 along with Aspen Healthcare's three other London hospitals for £226 million and leased back to Aspen on a 25-year lease.

The hospital featured in a reported legal case in tort, Batt v Highgate Private Hospital [2004] which established that a widower could not recover damages in respect of the cost of the cosmetic surgery which had resulted in his wife's death at the hospital.

It was expanded during 2015 at a cost of £13 million to provide 43 en-suite patient rooms, a High Dependency Unit, four  operating theatres, an Endoscopy Suite, Physiotherapy Suite, 15 outpatient rooms, and a private GP service.  Neurosurgery services were expanded in 2013 with the recruitment of consultant neurosurgeon  Mary Murphy.

The hospital director is Mark Lyons, formerly an anaesthetic practitioner in the NHS.

References

External links 
 

Hospitals in London
Private hospitals in the United Kingdom